Mississippi elected its sole member at-large August 4–5, 1828.

See also 
 1828 Mississippi's at-large congressional district special election
 1828 and 1829 United States House of Representatives elections
 List of United States representatives from Mississippi

1828
Mississippi
United States House of Representatives